"HIKARI" is Japanese voice actress and singer Maaya Uchida's 3rd album, released on October 27, 2021.

Track listings

Hello, ONLINE contact! Live Video

Charts

Event 
 『 Maaya Party！13 』　Maaya Uchida 3rd Album Release Event「Maaya Party！13」（December 11, 2021 - December 18, 2021：Online）

References

2021 albums
J-pop albums
Japanese-language albums
Pony Canyon albums